Baba Hari Dass (Devanagari: बाबा हरि दास) (26 March 1923 – 25 September 2018)  was an Indian yoga master, silent monk, temple builder, and commentator of Indian scriptural traditions of dharma and moksha. He was classically trained in the Ashtanga of Patanjali (also known as Rāja yoga), as well as Kriya yoga, Ayurveda, Samkhya, Tantra, Vedanta, and Sanskrit.

Baba Hari Dass took a vow of silence in 1952, which he upheld through this life. Although he did not speak, he was able to communicate in several languages through writing. His literary output included scriptural commentaries to Yoga Sutras of Patanjali, Bhagavad Gita, Samkhya Karika, and Vedanta, collections of aphorisms about the meaning and purpose of life, essays, plays, short stories, children's stories, kirtan, mantras, and in-depth instructional yoga materials that formed the basis of a yoga certification-training program.

Upon his arrival in North America in early 1971, Baba Hari Dass and his teachings inspired the creation of several yoga centers and retreat programs in the United States in Santa Cruz County, California, and in Canada at Salt Spring Island and in Toronto. He was an early proponent of Ayurveda, an ancient Indian system of health and healing, and helped introduce the practice to the United States.

In an annual rendition of Indian classic Ramayana, he taught performing arts, choreography and costume making. Baba Hari Dass devoted himself to helping others, with an emphasis on selfless service (karma yoga); In 1987 he opened Sri Ram Orphanage for homeless children in Haridwar India. To the local population of Nainital and Almora, Baba Hari Dass was also known as Haridas (lit "servant of Lord Hari"), Haridas Baba, Chota Maharaji (literally "little great king"), or Harda Baba.

Early life, education, and spiritual path

Hari Datt Karnatak was born on 26 March 1923 in the town of Almora in Uttarakhand, India. His family was of a Kumaoni Brahmin Karnatak lineage. Hari Datt was born in the lunar month of Chaitra, in Shukla Paksha (Rama Navami).

Hari Datt grew up in the lower Himalayan region of Kumaon, which includes Dunagiri (also called Dronagiri), the birthplace of modern-day Kriya Yoga and the temple of Shakti. Known since the Mahabharata War, the Kurmachalam region encompasses Almora district and Udham Singh Nagar district. Early in life he listened to stories told by older people about siddha yogis Sombari Baba Maharaj, Gudari Baba, Suri Baba, Khaki Baba, Aughar Baba, and several other saints of that region. His parents were devotees of a saint of Kumaon, Hariakhan Baba Maharaj, who was known to visit Almora.

On a journey to Haldwani in 1929, Hari Datt received his first darshana with the sage Sombari Baba Maharaj.

Darshana is viewed as experiencing the presence of a highly revered person, which can awaken latent potential for spiritual growth or intellectual understanding. American poet Gary Snyder, a Zen Buddhist practitioner, stated, "It's a gift; it's like there's a moment in which the thing is ready to let you see it. In India, this is called darshan. Darshan means getting a view."

Leaving home at the age of eight 
Hari Datt's early childhood years were marked by sadness and the feeling of separation: "When I was small, about five-six years old, I began to feel unhappy and sad inside. That sadness would be enhanced at the sunset at the Himalayas...A feeling of separation would come, and I would feel like I was closed inside a box where it is dark. The dome of the sky and the earth at night would make me feel like I was inside the box. 'How can I get out of this box?' was my constant question." His parents were puzzled by his strange behavior of leaving the house early in the morning and refusing to go into the house. He also didn't like to go to school to learn reading and writing.

His father, a Sanskrit scholar and tough disciplinarian, forced Hari Datt to memorize Sanskrit grammar and prayers. In 1931–1932, his father died at age 56 of a heart attack, an event which shook the whole family, but also brought Hari Datt a sense of relief. With the pressure lifted, Hari Datt was free to do anything he wanted. However, he assumed more responsibilities by helping his mother in farming, taking care of the cows, and threshing grain. Also, he had to go to school and do homework.

He was attracted to freedom that monks had in their lifestyle, unburdened by excess of clothing or work, and who did not have to attend school. "Whenever any monk would come to the village temple, I would go to see them, I started living like a monk." His mother came home one day to find him sitting, wearing only a loincloth, with wood ash smeared all over his body. She said, "Son, there is no happiness in the world, there is no peace in household life. I know you are very attracted to monk life but that is not an easy task either."

Hari Datt had several conversations with his mother about God, soul and peace. His view of the surrounding world as being a restraining box made of earth as the bottom and sky as the top induced him to weep. Deciding it had to be lifted, he made his conviction known to his mother, asking her to release him from the confinement of "this box of earth and sky." To that she said, "I can't". He replied, "I'm going."

Brahmacharya school 
With his mother's consent, he left home at the age of eight and joined an ashram for young yoga practitioners in the jungles of Kumaon, where he was initiated into Brahmacharya. "I was initiated at the age of eight and would do my practices every morning and night before eating food." A regimented daily schedule included six hours of sleep, rising at 4 am, walking a mile in the dark to bathe in a river regardless of the season or weather conditions, a teacher-guided group study of homework and preparation for exams. The underlying premise of that lifestyle, based in "We can train our body in any way we want," included daily duties of manual labor, carrying water from a river in a valley, collecting firewood, cooking, cleaning, and gardening. He practiced and became proficient in martial arts, Hatha Yoga, Shatkarma, Mudras and Sanskrit.

Naga Baba, Udasi Baba and Swami Nityananda Maharaj 
His interest in the monk lifestyle resurfaced on more than one occasion. He contacted traveling sannyasins in temples or in public engagements in order to learn their wisdom and inquire about yoga techniques. Some of those early encounters fell short of his expectations. Trying to learn about the life of Naga Baba (naked sannyasin) became a debacle. Mischief other boys engaged in, like throwing rocks or disturbing the monk's meditation resulted in cursing, angry outbursts and a chase.

Another sannyasin who attracted his attention was Udasi Baba, credited by adult followers as possessing super-normal powers over ghosts or curing sickness, and who lived in a cremation ground. One day, when he had nobody to cremate at his site, he joined an encampment of local people and looked like an ordinary man who craved attention. He acknowledged that his tales of subduing ghosts were fabrications and that "ghosts are for those who are afraid of ghosts." These encounters resulted in diminishing attraction for a monk-like lifestyle for a young 12 year-old Brahmachari.

In 1935, he met Swami Nityananda Maharaj, who lectured and held gatherings that many adults attended. For a boy to mix with adults following monks was not encouraged. It was believed that young lads couldn't understand the spiritual subjects; however, from the Brahmachari perspective "Older people simply became a hindrance for youngsters." Since lectures of Swami Nithyanandaji's were in English, he could not understand the content. Yet was keen to observe the ascetic form of the Swami, who was wearing a tiger skin and using a trident staff, a follower of the Shiva order, and a pilgrim on his way to Mount Kailash. That experience brought in him questions and confusion about God, as he believed God could create and control everything.

First teaching in Hatha Yoga and Swami Satyananda Giri 
In 1936, he attended classes of Swami Satyananda Giri of Dashnami Sanyasi Sect (originated by Jagadguru Adi Shankaracharya), who visited Almora region. Swami Satyananda was well versed in classical yoga tenets and encouraged adults to use the practices of Hatha Yoga. He postulated that developing strong body, in which the soul resides, aids in the journey to attain emancipation. Techniques he demonstrated and explained were based in Hatha Yoga seven limbs: Shatkarma, Asana, Mudra, Pratyahara, Pranayama, Dhyana, and Samadhi. He also used Ayurvedic principles of the balanced food of three-doshas, consistent eating habits, and avoided oily and fat rich foods.

When young Brahmachari (Baba Hari Dass) was asked to demonstrate what he knew, Swamiji was surprised and pleased to see well developed postures, mudras, etc. Brahmachari explained he practiced those in Brahmachari School by his own doing rather than learning from someone else (asanas, pranayamas, shatkarmas, and mudras). Swamiji asked him to teach others in his class, who were adults. "Swamiji saw my sarvangasana and was very pleased. I showed the series of 12 postures of surya-namaskar (sun salutation). Swamiji liked the way I did the postures and said I should come back every morning and show the people the method of doing asanas." Due to that teaching experience, his feeling of a misfit in the class and shyness went away. He was also well received by adult learners.

Darshana of Anandamayi Ma and her Samadhi 
In 1936, when Anandamayi Ma visited Almora region, he experienced her in a trance state some interpreted as samadhi: "I heard that a woman saint was in town. Her name was Ananda Mayi Ma. I was very excited to see a woman saint... a woman who looked to be 35-40 years old. Her eyes were closed. Her face looked like golden light. Everyone outside bowed to her and people hurriedly took her to Ranikhet to a secluded place to rest." He listened to a lecture by a pundit who invoked the Yoga Sutras to interpret her state of consciousness and what level of samadhi she was in. Intrigued, he discussed further experienced darshan and how samadhi brings knowledge of God with an older colleague in the Brahmacharya coed. He was discouraged from viewing samadhi as an emotionally induced trance that could occur during devotional singing (kirtan) or dancing. In contrast, he was told that through formal training, the regular practice of pranayama and meditation (Dhyana), samadhi could be attained and take deeper roots.

Also in that discussion, the issue was raised of renouncing the world - becoming a sannyasi would require a radical departure from social norms compared to the householder life of grihastha, and "If everyone renounces the world, then one day all the old generation will die out and there will be no new generation." He agreed that such statement was quite right; however, since everyone is not meant to be a householder, the natural balance would still be sustained by everyone performing duties for the world. He held fast to that perspective for the rest of his life, never losing attraction for the life of renunciation.

After seeing Swami Nityananda Maharaj and Ananda Mai Ma, his desire to practice yoga increased. His quest continued as he visited different villages in Himalayan mountains around the age of 14,  encountering several Westerners who were learning yogic practices and later recalling them as "true seekers". His experiences with cultural diversity at a young age shaped his attitude towards an inclusive way of teaching yoga later on.

Initiation into Sannyasa diksha 
In 1942, at the age of 19, he was initiated with Sannyasa diksha  into the Vairagi-Tyagi Vaishnava order of Ramanandi Sampradaya (followers of Saint Ramananda originated in the 15th century). His guru, Baba Raghubar Dassji Maharaj, a reclusive sadhu that he met in Ramkot Hanuman Temple (Almora region), oversaw the initiation. A highly regarded renunciate and a Sanskrit Acharya, Maharaj was known for minimal verbal communication but lacked a large following. He met with his disciples only once every two or three years to convey yoga sādhanā instructions to his followers. He's quoted as saying: "First find unity within, in your thoughts, words and actions and the unity outside will follow you."

In 1952–1953, while living in a burial place called Ghati, Baba Hari Dass described experience of a legendary Kumaon yogi Hariakhan Baba while staying in a cave in cold winter. While sitting by the side of the fire he fainted and his left arm fell into that fire: "I saw Hariakhan Maharaj come into the room and bend over me…, I saw him clearly, removing my left arm from the fire pit... By some unknown power I was related to Hariakhan Maharaj."

Vow of silence and tapas
Silence is the only Voice of our God - Herman Melville (Pierre: or, The Ambiguities, Bk. XIV, ch. 1, 1852,)
In 1952, Baba Hari Dass took a continual vow of silence called mauna (or maunavrata). In a similar tradition of Buddhist meditative method of Vipasana, silence is used "as the process of self-purification by introspection."

In 1964, Bhagavan Das met Baba Hari Dass near a temple called Hanumangarhi, Nainital, and later wrote: "The sadhu was a muni, a yogi whose practice of austerity includes complete silence. For the previous twelve years, whenever he wanted to communicate, he would jot his thoughts succinctly on a small chalkboard." Similarly, in 1967, Ram Dass: "He is a jungle sadhu. He went into the jungle when he was 8 years old. He is silent (mauna). He has been mauna for 15 years. He writes with a chalkboard."

Even as continued silence would seem a radical but also inconvenient form of communication, several Western authors recognized the social value of silence. Among those were Jacques Derrida and Søren Kierkegaard. In their view, silence would function as a precursor for clearer and substantively deeper understanding. Michael Strawser (Assistant Professor of Philosophy at the University of Central Florida), commenting on Jacques Derrida's view of Soren Kierkegaard's meaning of silence, wrote, "What is needed is Kierkegaard's call to silence in order to recognize one's responsibility to the other." Silence is also valued by Perkey Avot, in the Jewish Sages guide for living, and functions as "a safety fence for wisdom".

In yoga, mauna is maintained with the aim of achieving uninterrupted concentration (ekagrata, Sanskrit: एकाग्रता). Side effects of such practice would include constraining outgoing emotions of the mind, such as anger, excessive argumentativeness, etc. In Ashtanga, mauna would be part of a larger body of practices called tapas (Sanskrit: तपस्). Overall, mauna as practice of tapas would not be viewed as penance but rather "as a mental training to develop will power".

In the beginning of his practice he encountered obstacles, "For twelve years I faced much difficulties...for two or three years you have to fight with anger." Since merely not talking is not considered a yogic silence, keeping a quiet mind is, "The mind can't be stopped merely by keeping your mouth shut."

In 1983, David C. Fuess (a writer for The Wall Street Journal), observed about Baba Hari Dass: "Babaji had not spoken for twenty-nine years and communicates by a means of a small chalk board." In 2008, Melissa Weaver, Santa Cruz Sentinel correspondent, wrote: "During classes, he sits in a wood-backed chair, his students... sit patiently while he writes his thoughts on a wipe-off board, which are then read aloud by a volunteer."

Karma yogi builder

Early on in his life Haridas Baba was influenced by the teachings of the Bhagavad Gita, which considers karma yoga to be a selfless service, and the most straightforward pathway to progress in spiritual life. He learned temple masonry from a local mason and used those skills in building temples, ashrams, idols, and rock walls. In more than one of those projects he had a lead role. In 1950–1964 with the help of local followers and volunteers, adults and children, he built Hanumangarh and later Kainchi Ashram in Nainital.The Divine Reality, a publication by Sri Kainchi Hanuman Mandir & Ashram, stated: "Haridas Baba used to come to Kainchi from Hanumangarh to supervise the construction work of Kainchi Ashram." In 1962, after Hanumangarh, and Kenchi (Kainchi) Ashram, he started to build an ashram at Kakrighat where Sombari Maharaj lived, which was later completed on a contract basis.

In the United States and Canada, he continued using his design, planning and construction skills. In February, 1982, after a fire burnt a recently constructed program building at Mount Madonna Center, in Watsonville, California, he used the event as an opportunity to build a larger structure with more capacity. His example inspired many volunteers to help with those karma yoga efforts. In 1983, Yoga Journal writer, Virginia Lee, said "Baba Hari Dass swings his hammer alongside everyone else". The same publication included two articles in 2002, Karma Yoga Awards and Saving Young Lives, that described how Baba Hari Dass donated proceeds from his books to the Sri Ram Foundation that was set up to help destitute children in India. From those funds, and other donations, Shri Ram Ashram was created near Haridwar, in India.

Local teacher-leader 
At the end of the 1930s several encounters with Western seekers in India shaped his attitude towards teaching yoga in the future. He became cognizant of a larger group of people wanting to learn yoga and the need to preserve genuine yogic tradition for these students. "When I was about 14 years old...I saw number of Westerners. Some had taken sannyasa..it was quite clear that they were true seekers" In India, yoga practices were tested for thousands of years and it became known how each method affects the body, mind and consciousness. By adopting a well-known method of Ashtanga of Patanjali, Yamas and Niyamas, as his core practice, he aimed to shorten the time required for mastering essential routines. Otherwise, if new experimentation is needed "when those methods are changed, they are again subject to testing."

Several of his early students were Europeans and followers of the back-to-basics philosophy who were traveling to India and were followed by beatniks, such as Allen Ginsburg and others. In the early 1960s, during one of the subsequent waves of interest in Indian spirituality and yoga, some newcomers to Nainital district were directed to Haridas Baba to receive instructions in hatha yoga, meditation and yogic life. "A young Englishman named Lawrie...was allowed to stay in the ashram, studying with Haridas Baba".

He had established a local following and was considered an adept teacher, a leader and builder in several building and karma yoga construction projects at Hanuman Garhi and Nainital Ashram temples. Dada Mukerjee (Sri Sudhir Mukerjee), recounting those events wrote: "Haridas was also very active in building the Kainchin temples and purchasing materials for them", and "Haridas...was well-versed in pujas and rituals, as well as in pranayam and meditation, and an experienced practitioner of hatha yoga..., he also looked after the devotees who came there... Ram Dass stayed there in 1967 and Lawrie in 1964, among others."

Western confluence (1964–1971)

Bhagavan Das and hospital episode 
Bhagavan Das was introduced to Baba Hari Dass at the Hanumangarhi, Nainital (the 'Fortress of Hanuman'), who was then a manager and builder of the temple. Bhagavan Das described that experience: "Hari Das was the real thing, a cave yogi", and, "I showed Hari Dass Baba how I did these kriyas, and he helped me perfect my technique".

In 1968, in meditation, Bhagavan Das, according to his own account, intuitively knew that Baba Hari Dass was in some danger, then under a supervised doctor care in Agra, arranged by Neem Karoli Baba. Bhagavan Das drove from Nainital overnight and removed him from that life-threatening condition. After few days Baba Hari Dass wrote, "You saved my life". Explaining that episode, Bhagavan Das interpreted the event with considerable hesitation. He reported the incident took place in Lucknow (not in Agra) and interpreted Baba Hari Dass' refusal of further treatments as a dislike of Western medicine: "being subjected to Western medical techniques was a death sentence." He didn't offer Baba Hari Dass' view of that medical treatment and left the reason why and by whom it was arranged unanswered.

Ram Dass – learning yoga
In 1967 an ex-Harvard professor Richard Alpert (Ram Dass) travelled to India and was taken to Kainchi - Nainital region by Bhagavan Dass. At that time Baba Hari Dass was already an accomplished yoga teacher and had a large following. On his guru Neem Karoli Baba's recommendation, Ram Dass received teachings of Ashtanga: "Baba Hari Dass was my teacher. I was taught by this man with a chalkboard in the most terse way possible".

Baba Hari Dass trained Ram Dass in Rāja yoga: asana, pranayama, mantras, mudras, ahimsa (non-violence) and focused meditation. "Hari Dass Baba, who had been my sadhana tutor while I lived in Kainchi. Each morning around 11:30 Hari Dass Baba would come from Hanumangarh sixteen kilometers away to give me lessons in yoga." The aim of training and practices of yoga-sadhana was for Ram Dass to become an adept practitioner and teacher of the classical Yoga Sutras of Patanjali in the US and to increase interest in yoga and spirituality in general. Building a yoga center in India or the US and publishing yoga books authored by Baba Hari Dass were also discussed.

That training of several months continued in a series of letters between Baba Hari Dass and Ram Dass in the period of 1967–1969. "He was training me to become an ascetic, although I never really became one." Ashtanga practices and observances were later included in the 1971 book Be Here Now and became a reference material for beginning yoga learners in the 1970s until Baba Hari Dass authored his comprehensive and detailed Ashtanga Yoga Primer (1977).

Some benefits of those learning experiences in India were long-lasting, "The aphasia has introduced silence into my conversation...I had training for this kind of thing when I was with Baba Hari Dass in India. I was mauna,"  or, "Silence brought me great energy of clarity. As Hari Dass wrote, 'Nothing is better than something.'"

Parting from Neem Karoli Baba 
In 1968, Haridas, "who was very active in building the Kainichi temples and purchasing materials for them" in Nainital, discontinued involvement with Neem Karoli Baba. That association lasted since the mid-1950s when "Haridas with his band of enthusiastic and active associates, was managing the affairs of the temples and ashram in Hanumangarh".

Since his childhood Haridas Baba had accepted disciplined life as essential in spiritual progress. He became a monk and adopted silence as a way of seeking inner peace. For health reasons, and to eliminate digestive problems he had with his liver, he chose to drink a glass of milk once or twice a day instead of taking solid food. Since the early days of his association with Neem Karoli Baba he encountered several obstacles in his observance of silence, or eating habits. During one Kumbha Mela, he was obligated by Neem Karoli Baba to break those monastic rules for the reason of following the house rules as having higher but whimsical priority ("What is this rule? For what purpose is it made?").

When he became a teacher in the 1950s, Baba Hari Dass sought conducive circumstances for his teaching environment to benefit learners; "He wanted to build a small community of his own devotees". Several disruptions and conflicts that occurred in Kainchi ashram where he was a resident, teacher and supervisor, were not well suited for that end. The Kainchi ashram became a difficult place with charged economic claims between local residents and newcomers who were outsiders and who by displacing local members were not acknowledging their share of efforts in building and maintaining the ashram. Excessive hoarding of goods and secret dealings to cover for Neem Karoli Baba's sudden appearances and disappearances in order to create an impression of yogic powers (siddhis) were also contentious issues. Recognizing that, Neem Karoli Baba's intimate devotee, (Sudhir) Dada Mukerjee wrote, "cases have caused much misunderstanding and heart-burning among some, and have remained as enigmas for others."

Cases, which point to abuses, Mukerjee interpreted as needed for the grace of his guru to manifest, so that others, including "Bhabania and Haridas", could benefit from, and that "we can understand reasons for the hard treatment." In that context, the author does not explain how contentious circumstances would justify and absolve actions that had abusive intent.

Following those events, in 1970, several Westerners already familiar with Baba Hari Dass teaching style, travelled to India, Haridwar, and convinced him to come to the US to continue his way of silent teaching.

An inquiry whether Baba Hari Dass was a disciple of Neem Karoli Baba leads to a proposition that there was no long-lasting relationship of guru-disciple in the sense of guru-shishya (or chela), although that relationship extended over several years (1954–1968) and included selfless service, guru-seva or karma-yoga done by Baba Hari Dass. There was no sustained acceptance of the teachings (parampara), continuation of the said association that would last, or establishing a branch of teachings based on Neem Karoli Baba's orientation. The content of what Baba Hari Dass taught in Ashtanga, Vedanta, Ayurveda or Samkhya classes to his students in India, in the US, or Canada, came from the independent research of his own. Acknowledging that, while in the US, to a question "How many teachers did you have", Baba Hari Dass replied "Myself."

Ma Renu 

Ruth Horsting (also known as Ma Renu and Ruth Johnson) was a professor of arts at the University of California, Davis. She taught sculpture at UC Davis from 1959 until 1971. She was contacted in 1970 by her students, Bondana and Mahendra Mark Jungerman, who were then searching for an advanced yoga teacher in India and they had found Baba Hari Dass in Haridwar. Another person who contacted Baba Hari Dass during 1970 was Paul C. Adams (also known as Prem Das).

On that occasion the prospect of inviting Baba Hari Dass to the United States was raised. "They stayed with me and asked me to go to the United States. I said I could go anywhere. I was ready to move to the higher mountains". In 1971, on the recommendation of her students, Baba Hari Dass was invited to the United States, and Ma Renu sponsored his stay for the purpose of teaching yoga. Ma Renu described her first meeting Baba Hari Dass: "I felt there was no time to lose. I had already given my permission to sponsor his stay in America, but what had been intended as a short stay, turned into a 29 year darshan and blessing." At the age of 52, Horsting devoted herself fully to the study of Ashtanga.

That association over the years became a fruitful fulfillment of selfless service ideals when several organizational projects and service missions were formed in the US, Canada and India. In 1976, Baba Hari Dass directed her in forming Sri Rama Foundation to support Sri Ram Ashram for destitute children located in Shyampur, in Uttarakhand near Haridwar.

Anand Dass
Jerry Tabachnick (also known as Anand Dass) became one of the first students who recognized the need to study yoga with a live master. He became a highly regarded disciple and commentator. In 1970, he travelled to India to study with Baba Hari Dass and to gain deeper understanding of yoga. He was also active in organizing the Vancouver Satsang in Canada and became a Yoga Sutras commentator and teacher and co-authored Dharma Sara publications on yoga and yoga related subjects (1974–76).

Prenatal Yoga
Baba Hari Dass agreed to mentor his pregnant student Jeannine Parvati through a course of prenatal Yoga. During that time she continued practicing asanas and authored Prenatal Yoga & Natural Childbirth, published in 1974. As the daughter of a First Nation father (Ute tribe) and as a longtime student of Baba Hari Dass, Jeannine Parvati Baker's midwifery philosophy was one of earth-based values and non-harming principles.

After "Prenatal Yoga" gained in popularity, Baba Hari Dass expounded supporting practices of yoga to include prenatal asana, pranayama, meditation, Ayurveda, and mindfulness techniques for labor that formed the basis of Prenatal Yoga Teacher Training. The emphasis was given on anatomy and physiology of pregnancy, common discomforts in pregnancy, and how to support mothers through every stage of pregnancy and postpartum.

The impact of Be Here Now and Chota Maharaji
"How the Swamis Came to the States", written by Richard Leviton, in Yoga Journal, Mar/Apr 1990, proposed a timeline of influential yoga teachers in the US. That overview covered 100 years (1890–1990) of multicultural developments in yoga influences with a focus in larger audience teaching. Among those, the beginning of yoga teaching of Baba Hari Dass in the US was seen as starting in 1971. Prior to that, Baba Hari Dass's reputation preceded his arrival in America by several years, confirming his teaching engagements going back to at least 1968 as well established in India. Earlier credible accounts also exist (Bhagavan Das and Ram Dass) that confirm in 1963–64 he was a teacher of already considerable skills engaged in teaching others.

In February 1971 Baba Hari Dass was teaching in the US, and later the same year Be Here Now (1st edition, Oct 1971) by Ram Dass was published by the Lama Foundation, in New Mexico. Be Here Now, a manuscript initially titled From Bindu to Ojas (one thousand copies published in 1970), included information on yoga practices and theory compiled from what Baba Hari Dass had taught about hatha yoga, yogic life and conduct during daily morning sessions in Nainital mentioned by Ram Dass in his later writings, "I spent five months under his tutelage". That book, viewed as significant contribution to the public knowledge in the United States and Canada about yoga and Baba Hari Dass as a master yogi, was re-edited after "eighty thousand copies" were already distributed. Richard Leviton uses the first edition of Be Here Now. He notes that Ram Dass called Baba Hari Dass "this incredible fellow" as one of his teachers. Ram Dass used several affirmative remarks about Baba Hari Dass, also known as Chota Maharaji in his native Nainital-Almora region, that he later removed from the first edition.

In Be Love Now, published in 2010, explanation was given for the content removal in a dialogue between Ram Dass and his guru Neem Karoli Baba that took place in 1971. "I had mixed up Hari Dass and Maharaji when I heard the story from Hari Dass." "The story", which is repeated with some changes in another autobiographical book Polishing the Mirror: How to Live from Your Spiritual Heart, was about who left his home at the age of eight. Several sources pointed out that Neem Karoli Baba left his home at the age of 11–12 years old, "After the wedding, the groom left home and wandered the country". For Baba Hari Dass, leaving home took place at younger age when he was eight years old. With a sense of needed spiritual liberation and the discussion he had with his mother, "Take me out of this box of earth and sky," Baba Hari Dass left home and was not bound by the customary child marriage in India arrangement prevalent at that time, before it was declared illegal in 1929, or by the family's promise obligations that such marriage would impose.

Teaching to learn (1971-2018)

Physical foundation and social involvement
In the US, in early 1971, in Sea Ranch in Sonoma County, and in Santa Rosa, California, he started teaching core yoga practices which later became an aerobic hatha yoga regimen of Fitness Asanas aimed to increase physical endurance in support of meditation. Later, kirtan, mudras, fire ceremony (yajna), and satsang were introduced to complement a busy schedule. In 1972, as interest grew, several events were organized that included demonstrations of yoga asanas, shatkarma, and mudras (Lama Foundation in New Mexico, Coconut Grove in Florida, and Santa Cruz in California). He also traveled to Canada to establish Dharmasara community in Toronto, Salt Spring Centre of yoga, on Salt Spring Island BC, and Dharma Sara Satsang, in Vancouver, BC.

In 1973, the Lama Foundation published his first book, The Yellow Book, a collection of aphorisms that included terse but revealing statements ("all babies are yogis"), or longer question-answer format on life topics. In 1975 his second book, "a compilation of stories about one of the greatest and most mysterious of India's saints", Hariakhan Baba - Known, Unknown, was issued by Sri Rama Foundation. In 1977 came out another collection of a well-received question-answer discussions in Silence Speaks, which became a hallmark of his silent style of teaching with few written words in subsequent publications by Sri Rama Publishing.

His experiences and skills in designing, building and management of Kainchi and Hanumangarh ashrams in Nainital, India, took a new form when the Hanuman Fellowship was created in 1974 in Santa Cruz, California. He advised his followers to write letters to friends, associates, etc., to find a large, open space, in out-of-city surroundings. After a long search, in 1976, one response came from Lois Bateson (wife of the late anthropologist Gregory Bateson) who located a ranger who managed a large property in the Santa Cruz Mountains that would be sold on the condition the new buyers would preserve its natural state. That led to the establishment in 1978 of Mount Madonna Center for Creative Arts in Watsonville. The vast space of the mountainous terrain was well suited for physical work with many volunteers working as karma yogis.

On 23 February 1982, the main program building was already finished, when a candle light from a puja-table started a fire that burnt that building down. In the summer of the same year, "the response to the disaster was overwhelming", and a new plan was implemented to build a larger program building that could host multi-user activities. Baba Hari Dass developed a three-tier yoga teaching schedule for beginners, intermediate and advanced practitioners. Regular classes in the Yoga Sutras, Bhagavad Gita, satsang events, Ramayana play, martial arts, sport activities with annual Hanuman Olympics and retreats provided rich holistic background in learning.

Baba Hari Dass emphasized physical work and volunteer karma yoga services. The aim of such approach was that social contact and interaction while working together would translate into other areas and would support coherent functioning of the multi-purpose facility "where a spiritual aspirant could come to learn yoga and find peace." Around those ideas similar projects were created at Salt Spring Centre of Yoga (1974) in Canada, in Vancouver, BC, and in Pacific Cultural Center in Santa Cruz, California (1989).

US temples and religious symbols

Emphasis on bhakti yoga derived from the teachings of the Bhagavad Gita and Ramayana inspired several of his students to travel to India in 2001 in search of a Hanuman murti. "When that statue arrived," Baba Hari Dass wrote, "It needs a Temple." He walked to the ceremonial site and marked out a location for the temple with his foot. The Prana pratishta ceremony, "establishing the breath" within the sacred image, was performed in 2003. Sankat Mochan Hanuman, Ganesh temples, Nandi-Shiva lingam water cascade, and several idols of deities were built at the Mount Madonna Center site. Conceived as an alternative bhakti yoga tract, the site serves local residents and can accommodate visitors from the wider community of the San Francisco Bay Area in daily visits.

Human psychology contribution 
In the West transpersonal psychology became a rich and productive field in psychology, anthropology and psychiatry. Practices and theories of yoga added to that impact while researchers focused on energies of the subtle body that in yoga terms relate to SukShma sharira. Several authors credited Baba Hari Dass for his contributions and adept views. Steven Simon Bentheim PhD commenting on spiritual marriages that were made and fell apart despite the blessings of the guru, wrote: "Baba Hari Dass soon realized that the ideal of abstinence as a tool for spiritual development — whether it be dietary or sexual was a problem in the West."

Bonnie Greenwell, while working on her PhD in Transpersonal Psychology (Energies Transformation: A Guide to the Kundalini Process) was allowed to study "the unpublished manuscripts of the Jnana yoga teacher Baba Hari Dass."

Stuart Sovatsky PhD, commenting on Ken Wilber, Ram Dass and others whose work focused on "[solo] spiritual heroes" unwittingly garbled into Western lives the specialized family-less "sadhu trip", wrote that Baba Hari Dass warned all Western seekers not to mix up Western life style and stringent sadhu requirements. Commenting on that he wrote, "For Westerners Brahmacharya is almost impossible because association between sexes is so free. Don't mix the sadhu trip in this thing."

Ayurveda
Baba Hari Dass was one of the early proponents who helped bring Ayurveda to the US in the early 1970s, an ancient Indian system of health and healing. He taught combined classes in Ashtanga, Samkhya and Ayurveda as "sister sciences". As interest grew, the three-dosha theory, pulse detection, and ayurvedic medicum derived from the classic scriptures of the Sushruta Samhita and the Charaka Saṃhitā, were introduced that led to the establishment of the Mount Madonna Institute, College of Ayurveda, Ayurveda World, and Ayurvedic pharmacy. He invited several notable Ayurvedic teachers, Dr. Vasant Lad, Sarita Shrestha, M.D., Professor Ram Harsh Singh, Ph.D., and others. Michael Tierra, Ayurvedic medicine practitioner, wrote: "The history of Ayurveda in North America will always owe a debt to the selfless contributions of Baba Hari Dass" (The way of Ayurvedic Herbs, Lotus Press, 2008, p. XIV).

Yoga Teachers Training 
Following the tradition of non-sectarian teachings of Ashtanga, with the roots in practical Hatha yoga and the metaphysics of Samkhya, Baba Hari Dass inspired and supervised several programs with focus in training future yoga instructors. He first started teaching yoga in India as per existing accounts by Bhagavan Das in 1964, and by Ram Dass in 1965–66. By some other accounts, his teaching engagements occurred already in 1958 when he trained several former students of the known mystic George Gurdjieff (1866–1949).

In the US and Canada, beginning in the mid-1970s, he created comprehensive teaching programs combining the eight limbs of the Yoga Sutras of Patanjali. Those were grounded in the scriptural tradition of Hatha yoga system in the Hatha Yoga Pradipika, Siva Samhita, and Gherand Samita, Yoga Vashishta. With the emphasis on strength and flexibility he developed fitness asanas to increase physical endurance. Pranayama, a stable control and expansion of energy, was given prominence in focused support of meditation. Kirtan, mudras, the theory of gunas of Samkhya and the subtle body, or SukShma sharira of Tantra and Vedantic philosophy were also included. Regular and persistent practice (sadhana and Abhyasa) augmented scriptural references and emphasized experience through regular routine.

In addition to core practices of Rāja yoga, several less mainstream teachings are given during the formative stages of Yoga Teacher Training at Mount Madonna Center, Watsonville, CA. For example, Tantric Bhairavī Chakra Sadhana and The Vairagī Ritual is a circular yoga sādhana performed with an equal number of men and women that employs yantras to invoke the various forms of Devi, or Durga as the supreme Being in the Shaktism tradition. Practices such as Shut Chakra Bedhana (piercing the chakras) and Yoni Mudra Japa are included. That sadhana used as the Vairāgī Vaiṣṇavas practice does not have a sexual component.

Sri Ram Ashram 

Baba Hari Dass in his travels through India encountered many abandoned children who were in need of home and a caring place. As a young boy Baba Hari Dass witnessed the mistreatment of children at an orphanage he visited with his friend. Prompted by that experience and using the proceeds from his yoga books and generous donations, "he established a loving home for children in need". One of his students, Ma Renu, inspired by the teachings of selfless service (karma yoga) traveled to India to launch in 1984 Sri Ram Ashram, a children's home, school, and medical clinic in rural location of the northern state of Uttaranchal.

The Ashram, now located near Haridwar (Shyampur village) was established in 1987. From its inception, the focus became to support orphaned and destitute children. Some children find their way to Sri Ram Ashram by being brought and left at the entrance gate, or by being found abandoned in streets of towns, or rural places. After medical evaluation those children are brought into the new surroundings with care and loving attention. In 1987, Sri Ram Vidya Mandir became a nationally accredited school, which educates children, Nursery through 12th grade standard, from both the orphanage and nearby villages.

Scriptural focus

The aim
Attainment of higher states of concentration according to Rāja yoga (classical yoga of Patanjali) is rooted in development of the physical body (Hatha Yoga). "The body is a boat which carries the soul in the ocean of the world. If it is not strong, or if has a hole, then it can't cross the ocean. So the first duty is to fix the boat." With the physical body gaining in strength and guided by a disciplined life, an adept can receive more refined instructions and teachings, called sadhana. Regular sadhana, according to Baba Hari Dass, is a key element of practice of yoga, and no matter what method is adopted sadhana becomes an anchor that can always be relied on.

Baba Hari Dass, himself a monk all his life, considered people who are married as also capable of leading yogic life. Due to their daily care for children, a regular sadhana would take a form of Grihasta Yoga (householder yoga), "It is a union of two people in which they sacrifice their personal desires to become one."

Yoga tradition of Dattatreya and Patanjali
Several authors hold that Dattatreya ("Datta son of Atri", also known as Datta Guru), to whom Advahuta-Gita is ascribed (the fourth century C.E.), was the first who originated tradition of Ashtanga (astha-anga-yoga), or Rāja yoga (eight-fold path of Yoga). Dattatreya is also credited with the authorship of Jivan-Mukti-Gita ("Song of Living Liberation") that extols the adept who is liberated while still in the body, as well as Tripura-Rahasya ("Tripura's Secret Teaching").

Yoga, as a spiritual practice, likely developed prior to the sixth and fifth centuries BCE, in the same ascetic circles as the early sramana movements. Several Upanishads (Ranade, R. D., dating from the 1200 – 600 BC), have particular relevance to the teachings of yoga (Katha, Prasna, Mundaka, Chandogya, Brihadaranyaka, or Shvetasvtara). Those writings predate Buddhist tradition of more formal yoga-practices described in the Buddhist Nikayas. Some authors, evaluating various opinions about the origin of Yoga, state that "It can certainly be argued that the germs of yogic thought can be found in embryonic form in the (middle period) Vedic literatures themselves, the Aranyakas and Brahmana texts" (most likely between c. 1500–1200 BC).

Ascertaining various sources, Baba Hari Dass, composed his own in-depth commentary to The Yoga Sutras of Patanjali that elucidates difficult theoretical concepts with many years of experience and knowledge of practices of yoga. Some authors assert that Patajali's Yoga Sutras and Yoga practices in general "had been virtually forgotten for the better part of seven hundred years" until it was rehabilitated at the end of the nineteenth century by Swami Vivekananda. However, scriptural research may have to be evaluated in addition to localized Yoga traditions that rely on the word of mouth transfer of yogic knowledge and are centuries older in duration than indicated by the theoretical speculation.

Building upon Himalayan Kumoan tradition of centuries old yoga development, Baba Hari Dass started his weekly Yoga Sutras of Patanjali classes at the University of California, at Santa Cruz, CA in 1975. Several commentaries and yoga classics were referenced, such as: Yoga Vashishta, Hatha Yoga Pradipika, Shiva Samhita, Goraksha Samhita,Yoga Bhashya attributed to Veda Vyasa (probably the fifth C.E.); Īśvarakrishna's Samkhyakarika (4th or 5th century CE); Vācaspati Miśra's Tattvavaiśāradī (the ninth century C.E.); Yogavartika of Vijnanabhiksu (the sixteenth century C.E.); Swami Hariharananda Aranya's (1869–1947) Yoga Philosophy of Patanjali, and Pandit Usharbudh Arya's commentary (1986). In his exposition of the yoga principles, continued until 2012, the Yoga Sutras of Patanjali and Ashtanga played a fundamental and formative role in educating yoga seekers.

According to Baba Hari Dass, "Yogah means samadhi, or the state that occurs when mental modifications are controlled by persistent practice and dispassion." Patanjali's Yoga Sutras define the meaning of yoga as "Control of thought waves in the mind" (I:2), or as nirodha (mental control), "by which union (the goal of yoga) is achieved." Nirodha is the process, while resultant niruddha is the state of perfection. The path that assumes dualistic individuality becomes the nondual state "characterized by the absence of individuality." In that sense, the goal of yoga can be described "as eternal peace, pure love, Self-realization, or liberation", or as "a prescription for liberation from the cycle of suffering."

Samadhi Pada (vol I), is an exposition of upaya, the primary means of yoga, together with the more advanced subject of the efficiency of practice abhyasa and dispassion (vairagya). Sadhana Pada (vol II) presents practical methods for the yogis who are aspiring to higher states of concentration and need to remove mental distractions (viksipta). Those practical methods constitute Kriya Yoga and make the mind ready for one-pointed concentration (ekagra-dhyana), which results in the steadiness of concentration, or samahita chitta. In  Vibhuti Pada (vol III), pratyahara is further developed into concentration (dharana), meditation (dhyana), and into the state of absorption samadhi. Those states, when mastered in succession are the foundation of samyama;  "samyama is perfect control of mental concentration" (p. 7); and "The samyama is not complete unless there is a fusion of these three processes of concentration"; it should also be noted that the perfection of samyama constitutes "three internal limbs of concentration". Furthermore, Baba Hari Dass elucidates different aspects of samadhi and samyama and their resulting achievements in relation to viveka khyati, or discriminating faculty. Vol IV, Kaivalya Pada; the commentary to the last volume of Patanjali's Yoga Sutra was published in 2017.

Ramayana, Bhagavad Gita, and other writings
Among several versions of Ramayana, a colorful musical stage performance by students trained by Baba Hari Dass, is the largest yearly, Western version of the epic being performed on stage. Ramayana in India is a stage performances throughout villages and towns. Young actors and participants assume different roles each year thus being able to play several characters over years. In the United States, Baba Hari Dass trained students of Mount Madonna School in Watsonville, California, to continue that tradition in annual musical in June (first performance in 1974); "The play has grown to be the widely anticipated annual school event of the year in which the entire school participates". He has taught acting arts, costume design, mask making and choreography to bring alive the characters of Sri Ram, Sita, Hanuman, Lakshmana, Shiva and Parvati, Vibhishan, Jatayu, Sugriva, Surpanakha, Ravana and his rakshasa court, Meghnaad, Kumbhakarna, and the army of monkeys and demons. "Although it predated Star Wars by a few thousand years 'Ramayana' invites comparisons to the George Lukas film both in storyline and in underlying theme."

Bhagavad Gita – a commentary to Chapters 1–6 (Vol I, pub. 2013); the Bhagavad Gita uses a metaphor of a battle to convey the meaning of the inner struggle to attain knowledge of human condition. The struggle is between positive and negative tendencies. In this volume meaning of the three main types of yoga are articulated: Karma Yoga, Jnana Yoga, and Bhakti Yoga. The emphasis is given to the view that "action is superior to inaction" (p. 300). "Actions that are performed without self-interest and for the good of all are called sacrifice (yajna)"(p. 302), and those actions will not cause any bondage.

Samkhya Karika and Vedanta: A commentary to Isvara Krishna's (Samkhyakarika) exposition of Samkhya principles of 24 tattva system that culminates in full recognition of the Self, recognition which brings about the separation of Purusha, conscious principle from Prakriti, unconscious material principle. In editing stages: a commentary to Vedantic classic Panchadasi of Swami Vidyaranya, the commentary includes discussion of several Vedantic schools: Advaita Vedanta, Vishishtadvaita, and Dvaita. Fifteen chapters deal with the discrimination of Sat, Chit, and Ananda aspects of the Truth.

Later events and death 

In 16 October 2013, after physical examination, it was announced by his medical team that Baba Hari Dass "had a dramatic neurological change that has affected his mobility, stamina, and expression", and "his physicians have conducted all appropriate tests and have not found any treatable cause." At that time he discontinued his regular activities of teaching classes of Vedanta, Yoga Sutras, Bhagavad Gita, or attending ceremonial events. He did not resume his regular teaching schedule afterwards. He died in peace in hospice care at 10:32 a.m. on 25 September 2018, in Bonny Doon, near Santa Cruz, California. He was known and admired by local community. "He took his vow of perpetual silence in 1952, which he kept until his passing... Tuesday morning, a cremation ceremony was organized at Santa Cruz Memorial. It didn't take long before hundreds of people began lining up to pay their respects" (Register Pajaronian, 27 September 2018).

The Santa Cruz Sentinel published a front-page obituary titled "Silent monk Baba Hari Dass, who inspired thousands at the Mount Madonna Center, dies at 95":

His departure from the physical form (mahāsamadhi) took place during the month of Bhadrapad following Purnima (full Moon), on the first day of Krishna Paksha Pratipada as per Lunar Indian calendar system. Sraddha ritual was performed lakeside, on the 12th day after his mahāsamadhi, at Mount Madonna Center, Watsonville, California, on Sunday, 7 October. Santa Cruz Sentinel wrote: "About 1,500 people gathered Sunday morning at the Mount Madonna Center to commemorate Baba Hari Dass, the silent monk, teacher and guru... There were people of all ages in attendance Sunday, many wearing white, who came from the Santa Cruz area, as well as across the country and Canada to pay their respects to the man known to his students as Babaji. There was a serene, somber and intense atmosphere, with a combination of bells, chants and the sound of the wind filling the air." San Francisco Chronicle noted: "In the last five years ...due to a deterioration in his health, ...the community has already become accustomed to his physical absence, but it remains to be seen what the impact of his passing will be."

His ashes were immersed in the Ganga at Har Ki Pauri, in Haridwar, one of the holiest sites in India, on 19 November 2018, with special puja and arati, on auspicious day of Ekadashi.

Commentaries and literary works
 
 Hariakhan Baba: Known, Unknown, 1975, Sri Rama Foundation,
 The Magic Gem – A Story Coloring Book; 1976, Sri Rama Foundation; (Library of Congress 76–10032)
 Silence Speaks: Aphorisms From the Chalkboard of Baba Hari Dass, Sri Rama Foundation, 1977,
 Ashtanga Yoga Primer, Illustrated Practical Guide, Sri Rama Publishing, 1977,
 A Child's Garden of Yoga, Sri Rama Publishing, 1980,
 Sweeper to Saint: Stories of Holy India, A Collection of short stories; Sri Rama Publishing, July 1980,
 Cat and Sparrow, Sri Rama Foundation, 1982, Santa Cruz, CA;
 Mystic Monkey, Sri Rama Publishing, Sri Rama Publishing,1984,
 Fire Without Fuel: The Aphorisms of Baba Hari Dass, Sri Rama Publishing, 1986,
 Essays on the Search for Peace in Daily Life, 1. Binding Thoughts & Liberation, Sri Rama Publishing, 1992, 
 Essays on the Search for Peace in Daily Life, 2. Mind is Our World, Sri Rama Publishing, 1992,
 Essays on the Search for Peace in Daily Life, 3. Selfless Service, The Spirit of Karma Yoga, Sri Rama Publishing, 1995,
 Vinaya Chalisa: Forty Prayers, Sri Rama Publishing, 1994,
 The Path to Enlightenment is Not a Highway, Sri Rama Publishing, 1996,
 The Yoga Sutras of Patanjali: A Study Guide and Commentary for Book I Samadhi Pada, Sri Rama Publishing, 1999,
 Surya Namaskara, The Sun Salutation Series, Ashtanga Yoga Fitness Asana Series, vol. 1, Sri Rama Publishing, 2000,
 Everyday Peace: Letters for Life, Sri Rama Publishing, 2000,
 The Yoga Sutras of Patanjali: A Study Guide and Commentary for Book II Sadhana Pada, Sri Rama Publishing, 2008,
 Kshama Prarthana Pranam, Forgiveness Asana Series, Sri Rama Publishing, 1 June 2008
 Pigeon Throne, 2010, Sri Rama Publishing,
 Bronze Buddha, A Collection of three short stories, 2011, Sri Rama Publishing,
 Hand Mudras Pamphlet, 2011, Sri Rama Publishing,
 Srimad Bhagavad Gita: Chapters I-VI, A Study Guide and Commentary, Sri Rama Publishing, 2013,
 The Yoga Sutras of Patanjali: A Study Guide and Commentary for Book III Vibhuti Pada, Sri Rama Publishing, 2013,
 Srimad Bhagavad Gita: Chapters VII-XII, A Study Guide and Commentary, Sri Rama Publishing, 2014,
 Srimad Bhagavad Gita: Chapters XIII-XVIII, A Study Guide and Commentary, Sri Rama Publishing, November 2015,
 The Yoga Sutras of Patanjali: A Study Guide and Commentary for Book IV Kaivalya Pada, Sri Rama Publishing, 2017,
 Path Unfolds: The Autobiography of Baba Hari Dass, Sri Rama Publishing, 2019,

Notes

References

Citations

Works cited

Primary sources

Secondary sources

External links

 Talks With Babaji 
Sankat Mochan Hanuman

Videos 
 Hari Dass Baba Doing Rare Mudras
 Story Baba Hari Dass and Mt Madonna (Dallas Cyr)
 Sacred Hand Mudras (David Fuess)

1923 births
2018 deaths
20th-century Hindu philosophers and theologians
20th-century Hindu religious leaders
20th-century Indian philosophers
21st-century Hindu religious leaders
Advaitin philosophers
Hindu writers
Indian Hindu missionaries
Indian Hindu monks
Indian Hindu yogis
Indian religious writers
People from Nainital
People from Nainital district
Ram Dass
Vaishnava saints